was a Japanese politician and cabinet minister in the Taishō period and early Shōwa period Japan. He was the grandfather of Jun'ichirō Koizumi, who served as the Prime Minister of Japan from 2001 to 2006.

Early life
Koizumi was born in Mutsuura, Musashi Province (part of present-day Kanazawa-ku, Yokohama) to Koizumi Yoshibe, a scaffolder, and his wife Yuki. He moved to nearby Yokosuka, Kanagawa with his parents, where his father worked as a procurer of day laborers, carpenters, steeplejacks and materials for the Yokosuka Naval Arsenal. The young Koizumi grew up in a rough environment. In 1878, after graduating from the predecessor of Yokosuka Elementary School, he tried to enlist in a preparatory school for Imperial Japanese Navy officer candidates, but was returned home when it was discovered he was underage and did not have his father’s permission. He attempted the same again in 1880 to a preparatory school for the Imperial Japanese Army. On the death of his elder brother, he was forced to inherit his father’s business and around this time obtained a large tattoo of a red dragon which covered most of his back and upper arms, and was addressed as “boss” by his fellow steeplejacks. He also became a member of the Rikken Kaishintō in 1887 and around this time married Ayabe Nao, a 30-year-old geisha. In 1907, Koizumi fathered his only child, Yoshie, with Ishikawa Hatsu, one of his mistresses. Koizumi’s daughter gave birth in 1942 to a son, Junichirō, who later became Prime Minister.

In 1889, Koizumi became a reporter for the Mainichi Shimbun, and in 1903 was elected to the Kanagawa Prefectural Assembly. Vocal in support of ultranationalist causes, he participated in the Hibiya Incendiary Incident in protest of the Treaty of Portsmouth in 1905. In 1907, Koizumi was elected to the Yokosuka city assembly, and in the 1908 General Election successfully ran for a seat in the lower house of the Diet of Japan. He was reelected 12 consecutive times, holding his seat of 38 years until the end of World War II.  He rose to the post of secretary-general of the Kenseikai and was a leader in the movement towards universal suffrage, leading mass rallies in Tokyo. In 1924, he became Vice-Chairman of the House and also served as secretary-general of the Rikken Minseitō from 1928-1929 and 1937-1938.

In 1929, Koizumi was appointed Communications Minister in the 4th Hamaguchi administration and 2nd Wakatsuki administration. During this time, he was nicknamed the "wild man" or "irezumi minister", from his flamboyant speeches. As minister, he unsuccessfully sought to privatize the Japanese postal system.

In 1942, Koizumi became mayor of Yokosuka. In 1937, he joined the Imperial Rule Assistance Association and was appointed deputy chairman. In 1944, he was an advisor to Prime Minister Kuniaki Koiso.  He was selected to be a member of the House of Peers, but in 1946, under the occupation of Japan, he was purged from public office. He died in 1951.

Legacy
Koizumi's son-in-law, Jun'ya Koizumi, became a director general of the Japan Defense Agency and a second-generation member of the Diet of Japan. Koizumi's grandson, Jun'ichirō Koizumi, served as the Prime Minister of Japan from 2001 to 2006 and inherited his grandfather's idea of postal privatization; Jun'ichirō had himself been Minister of Posts and Telecommunications in 1992-93 under Prime Minister Kiichi Miyazawa.

See also 

 Koizumi family

References

External links

Biography at National Diet Library

1865 births
1951 deaths
People from Yokohama
Matajiro
Government ministers of Japan
Rikken Kaishintō politicians
19th-century Japanese politicians
Kenseikai politicians
Rikken Minseitō politicians
Imperial Rule Assistance Association politicians
Members of the House of Representatives (Empire of Japan)
Members of the House of Peers (Japan)